Timo Nieminen (born 2 March 1951) is a Finnish sports shooter. He competed at the 1984 Summer Olympics and the 1988 Summer Olympics.

References

External links
 

1951 births
Living people
Finnish male sport shooters
Olympic shooters of Finland
Shooters at the 1984 Summer Olympics
Shooters at the 1988 Summer Olympics
People from Orimattila
Sportspeople from Päijät-Häme